Victor Vlad Cornea (born 24 September 1993) is a Romanian tennis player. On 22 June 2015, he reached his highest ATP singles ranking of No. 786 whilst his highest doubles ranking was No. 105 achieved on 6 February 2023.

Career
In April, 2016, Vlad received a wildcard for the doubles event at the 2016 BRD Năstase Țiriac Trophy alongside fellow countryman Victor Hănescu.

He entered the main draw at the 2022 BMW Open with Petros Tsitsipas as alternate pair.

ATP Challenger and ITF Futures/World Tennis Tour finals

Singles: 1 (0–1)

Doubles: 47 (30–17)

References

External links

1993 births
Living people
Sportspeople from Sibiu
Romanian male tennis players
21st-century Romanian people